The 2024 State Treasurer in Pennsylvania will be held on November 5, 2024, to elect the Pennsylvania State Treasurer. Incumbent one-term Republican Treasurer Stacy Garrity  has not yet stated whether or not she is running for a second term.

Republican Primary

Candidates

Potential 

 Stacy Garrity, incumbent Pennsylvania State Treasurer (2021–present)

Democratic Primary

Candidates

Publicly expressed interest 

 Alan Butkovitz, former Philadelphia city controller (2006–2018) and former state representative from the 174th district (1991–2005)

See also 

 2024 Pennsylvania elections

References

2024 Pennsylvania elections
State treasurers of Pennsylvania
Pennsylvania